The fourth round of the women's team pursuit of the 2011–12 UCI Track Cycling World Cup took place in London, United Kingdom from 16 to 17 February 2012 and was part of the London Prepares series. 15 teams participated in the contest.

Competition format
The women's team pursuit race consists of a 3 km race between two teams of three cyclists, starting on opposite sides of the track.  If one team catches the other, the race is over.

The tournament consisted of an initial qualifying round.  The top two teams in the qualifying round advanced to the gold medal match and the third and fourth teams advanced to the bronze medal race.

Schedule
Thursday 16 February
Qualifying
Friday 17 February
19:27-19:42 Finals
19:50-19:58 Victory Ceremony

Schedule from Tissottiming.com

Results

Qualifying

Results from Tissottiming.com.

Finals

Final bronze medal race

Final gold medal race

Results from Tissottiming.com.

References

London Prepares series
UCI Track Cycling World Cup – Women's team pursuit
2011–12 UCI Track Cycling World Cup